Alden Mason may refer to:

 John Alden Mason (1885–1967), archaeological anthropologist and linguist
 Alden Mason (artist) (1919–2013), American painter